Oakham was an Urban District in Rutland, England from 1911 to 1974. It was created under the Local Government Act 1894.

Oakham Rural District had included the town of Oakham until 1911, when it was constituted as Oakham Urban District.

The urban district was abolished in 1974 under the Local Government Act 1972 and combined with the other local government districts of Rutland to form the new Rutland district of Leicestershire. Rutland subsequently regained county status and became a unitary authority in 1997.

References
Oakham UD

Districts of England created by the Local Government Act 1894
Districts of England abolished by the Local Government Act 1972
History of Rutland
Urban districts of England